The Tällihorn is a mountain of the Swiss Pennine Alps, located east of the Weissmies in the canton of Valais. It lies in the Val Divedro, south of the main Alpine watershed.

References

External links
 Tällihorn on Hikr

Mountains of the Alps
Alpine three-thousanders
Mountains of Switzerland
Mountains of Valais